The Biscuit Brothers is a half-hour Emmy-award winning public television program produced in Austin, Texas.  It was first aired on KLRU in 2004 and then aired nationwide in 2005.  The program uses a mixture of live-action, puppetry, and animation to learn cultural communication through country music to children and their parents.

The project was created and is produced by Allen Robertson, Jerome Schoolar, and Damon Brown.  The program features include "The Instrument of the Day", "Crazy Classics", and has songs that everyone can sing along with.

The Biscuit Brothers have performed live in hundreds of venues across Texas as well - most notably at the Austin City Limits Music Festival (ACL Fest) in 2004, 2005, and 2006. They are the musical host of the annual Austin Family Music Festival.

The program just aired its sixth season in Fall 2011 and plans to air a seventh in the fall of 2012.  It currently stars Allen Robertson as "Buford Biscuit" (also music director), Jerome Schoolar as "Dusty Biscuit" (also producer), Jill Leberknight as "Buttermilk Biscuit" (also the field producer), Damon Brown as "Tiny Scarecrow" (also director), and Ian Scott as "Old MacDonald".  Music icon Willie Nelson also contributed voice talent. the program often features numerous Austin musicians, nationally recognized US performers, as well as internationally recognized artists such as Evelyn Glennie.

The program is shot at Pioneer Farms in Austin, and the theater scenes are shot at the Scottish Rite Theater in Austin.

2006 American television series debuts
2000s American children's television series
2010s American children's television series
2000s American music television series
2010s American music television series
American children's education television series
American children's musical television series
American television series with live action and animation
American television shows featuring puppetry
Music education in the United States
Local children's television programming in the United States